Patna is the capital of Bihar, in India.

Patna may also refer to:

Places

India
Patna district
Patna division
Patna City (also known as Patna Sahib), a neighbourhood in Patna
Patna Sahib (Vidhan Sabha constituency), the Bihar legislative assembly constituency centered around the city.
Patna, Odisha
Patna (Vidhan Sabha constituency), the Odisha legislative assembly constituency centered around the town.
Patna (princely state)
Patna, Rajasthan

Others
Patna, East Ayrshire, Scotland (named after Patna in India)
Patna, Nepal
Patna, Virginia

Other
Patna, the ill-fated ship in the Joseph Conrad novel Lord Jim
Patna rice